"The Boatman's Dance" is a minstrel song credited to Dan Emmett in 1843.  In 1950 it was revived and arranged by Aaron Copland as part of his set of Old American Songs.

It is a celebration of the Ohio River boatmen, bawdy and wily, and is easily recognizable by its repeated clarion cry: "Hey, ho, the boatman row, sailin' on the river on the Ohio."

The song went through numerous revisions before a settled version passed into the repertoire.  Both the minstrel version and the Copland arrangement are widely performed and recorded.

The bluegrass jam band Yonder Mountain String Band regularly covers it and released a studio version as a hidden track on their release Town By Town.

External links
Audio (mp3 and .ram) performed by Thomas Hampson and Wolfram Rieger.

Songs about boats
Songs about sailors
Songs about dancing
Blackface minstrel songs
1843 songs
Songs written by Dan Emmett
Music of Pittsburgh